Čeplje is a settlement in the Municipality of Kočevje in southern Slovenia. The area is part of the traditional region of Lower Carniola and is now included in the Southeast Slovenia Statistical Region.

The local church, on a hill north of the settlement, is dedicated to Our Lady of Sorrows and was built in the 1840s.

References

External links

Čeplje on Geopedia

Populated places in the Municipality of Kočevje